Andrew Eltrincham Curran (born 5 July 1898) was an English professional footballer. A  centre-half or right-half, he played in the Football League for Sunderland, Blackpool and Accrington Stanley.

Curran began his career with local club Mickley, before joining Sunderland in 1920. After failing to make any League appearances for the Black Cats, he moved south to join Blackpool in 1921. He spent five years at Bloomfield Road, making 97 League appearances and scoring three goals. In 1926 he joined Accrington Stanley, with whom he remained for four years, clocking up 136 league appearances and scoring five goals. He finished his career back on the Fylde coast with Lytham.

References

1898 births
Year of death missing
People from Ryton, Tyne and Wear
Footballers from Tyne and Wear
English footballers
Sunderland A.F.C. players
Blackpool F.C. players
Accrington Stanley F.C. players
Association football wing halves